The Silence is a 2019 horror film directed by John R. Leonetti and starring Kiernan Shipka, Stanley Tucci, Miranda Otto, and John Corbett. The screenplay by Carey and Shane Van Dyke adapts the 2015 horror novel of the same name by Tim Lebbon. The film depicts a world under attack by creatures who hunt by sound. Shipka plays a deaf teenager who seeks shelter with her family, and a cult tries to take advantage of her fertility.

Netflix released The Silence on April 10, 2019. It was also released in theaters in seven countries in the rest of 2019, grossing $2.3 million.

Plot 

A cave research team unearths an unknown species of pterosaur-like creature, referred to as "vesps", from a mine. The vesps violently kill the researchers, fly out of the mine, and seek the noisiest areas.

Ally Andrews, a teenage girl who lost her hearing in a car accident, lives with her  parents Hugh and Kelly Andrews; her maternal grandmother Lynn, who has terminal lung cancer; her brother Jude; and a pet dog. As news of the vesp outbreak spreads, the U.S. government declares a state of emergency and asks people to stay indoors and quiet. Hugh recommended the family to put their cellphones on silent mode, and, they see four videos, one showing two victims running, the second one showing a mother and her child in a car. The child has her mouth taped, 
and the mother shows a note written, "Don't make noise". The third one shows the cave research team screaming, and it cuts to another shot of the  vesps fleeing, shortly before getting interrupted by an emergency broadcast. Ally suggests they head to the countryside, which is likely to be quieter. Glenn, Hugh's best friend, joins them and brings his guns. They set out in two cars, but a man tries to hijack Hugh's car, risking the family. Glenn shoots the man in the leg, and they drive away.

The group hits a massive traffic jam, blocking all the interstates, and Glenn goes off-road. Speeding through the countryside, Glenn's car hits a herd of fleeing deer and tumbles down the embankment. He survives but is trapped in the car. Hugh and Kelly fail to free him, and Glenn asks Hugh to leave. As the Andrews family returns to their car, their dog barks, attracting the vesps. Glenn fires his gun, leading them away from the Andrews and sacrificing himself. To keep his family safe, Hugh is forced to let their dog out of the car to die.

Hugh leads his family on foot after setting Glenn's car on fire as a decoy. Lynn struggles to keep up, and her coughing puts the family at risk. The family finds a house with a high fence and locked gate. The homeowner, unaware of the situation, comes out and speaks and the vesps rip her apart. The family uses a storm drain to enter the house. A rattlesnake appears in front of Jude, attracting the vesps with its rattle they proceed to attack it. The attracted vesps bite Kelly's leg from behind. Hugh distracts them by turning on a woodchipper, crushing the vesps flying into it, and the family enters the house.

Ally contacts her boyfriend, Rob, who tells her his parents are dead. She learns that religious cults have sprung up in the wake of the disaster. By morning, Kelly's wound is infected, so Hugh and Ally leave to find antibiotics. At the store, Ally discovers vesp eggs growing inside corpses. The tongueless reverend of a cult tries to recruit them, but Hugh and Ally leave. They return with the antibiotics and Kelly recovers. Ally learns from the internet that vesps cannot survive in the cold, prompting the family in planning to head to the north.

The reverend finds the family's hide-out and shows up with his followers, revealing that he intends to recruit Ally. Hugh brings out his gun, forcing the cultists to leave. Rob lets Ally know he is headed north to "the refuge". Hugh and Kelly find a little girl at the door in the middle of the night. After letting her in, they find she is a member of the tongueless cult. Phones strapped to her and placed around the house go off, attracting vesps. The cult members abduct Ally but Grandma Lynn runs outside to help her. Lynn holds Ally's captors down and screams; vesps kill her and the captors while Ally escapes. The family fights back and kills most of the cult, including the reverend.

Weeks later, the family treks across America and arrives at the refuge. Ally finds Rob and they hunt the vesps with arrows. Ally wonders whether the vesps will adapt to the cold and whether humans will adapt to a soundless lifestyle, like she did when she lost her hearing.

Cast

 Stanley Tucci as Hugh Andrews
 Kiernan Shipka as Ally Andrews
 Miranda Otto as Kelly Andrews
 Kate Trotter as Lynn
 John Corbett as Glenn
 Kyle Harrison Breitkopf as Jude Andrews
 Dempsey Bryk as Rob
 Billy MacLellan as The Reverend

Production
The Silence is based on the 2015 horror novel of the same name by Tim Lebbon. The film is directed by John R. Leonetti based on an adapted screenplay by Carey Van Dyke and Shane Van Dyke. Actors Kiernan Shipka and Stanley Tucci were cast in the film in May 2017. In the following August, additional cast members were hired.

Principal photography began in Toronto in September 2017.

According to the film's production notes, the creatures are named "Vesps" after the Spanish avispa, meaning wasps. Director John R. Leonetti said that research was done into other cave creatures in order to design the Vesps. "Their skin is translucent, they have wings and they fly, but they also crawl and lay eggs like reptiles ... A lot of scientific research went into the design, the creation, and the computer animation of the creatures, right down to the detail of every joint, every vessel, and every move they make."

Release

Netflix released The Silence on April 10, 2019. Global Road Entertainment originally acquired in December 2017 the U.S. distribution rights to the film and was supposed to be released theatrically on December 7, 2018. The distributor had financial troubles, and in a failed attempt to avoid bankruptcy, Global Road pulled the film from the release schedule and sold distribution rights to various films, including The Silence, to Netflix.

The film was also released in seven countries around the world like Austria, Germany, Switzerland, Bolivia, Singapore, South Korea, and China, grossing over $2.3 million.

Critical reception
The site's critics' consensus reads: "The Silence has nothing new to say with a derivative premise and placid pacing -- even a wasted Stanley Tucci is unable to elevate the stodgy material a decibel above dreadful." Metacritic assigned the film a score of 25 out of 100 from 4 critics, reflecting "generally unfavorable reviews".

Scott Tobias, reviewing for The New York Times, called The Silence "niche-targeted dreck" where "only a quality cast and more generous production values can cover up the shoddy stitching". Tobias said despite the film's depiction of "a grand evolutionary struggle... every moment feels like regression". RogerEbert.coms Brian Tallerico said that The Silence was "a dull retread of ideas explored more interestingly in other films and TV shows", and went on to say, "'The Silence' is barely a horror movie, and that's its biggest problem. A horror movie needs stakes, and you just never feel them here."

Social commentary

Deaf portrayal
Hearing actress Kiernan Shipka plays the lead character, a deaf teenager who battles monsters. Shipka learned some parts of American Sign Language for the role, and director John R. Leonetti said in an interview, "She learned to sign for the film, and now she's flawless, like she's been signing her entire life. She seems to have an almost innate sense of what it's like being a deaf person." Deaf celebrities Nyle DiMarco and Marlee Matlin and other members of the deaf community criticized Leonetti for saying that Shipka learning to sign was synonymous with knowing the culturally deaf experience and for undermining deaf representation by casting a hearing actor. DiMarco also criticized Shipka's ASL grammar, and others pointed out plot holes related to her character being deaf.

Comparison to A Quiet Place

The Silence was compared to A Quiet Place, a 2018 horror film with a similar premise. The novel The Silence was published in 2015, and filming of the adaptation took place in 2017, at the same time as A Quiet Place. While The Silence was acquired by a distributor, it was not released in theaters and was later picked up by Netflix. Quartzs Adam Epstein said while the parallel productions were coincidental, he compared The Silence to mockbusters (low-budget films that exploit blockbusters), highlighting that one of its screenwriters, Shane Van Dyke, wrote several scripts for The Asylum, a studio that specializes in mockbusters. The novel's author Tim Lebbon admitted that the two films' similarities are "a little troubling" and defended the film adaptation of his novel, "There are similarities, of course, but I'm confident that the movie of The Silence will stand on its own."

The Guardians Charles Bramesco called The Silence "a shoddy remix" of A Quiet Place and said, "The Silence exists for the sole purpose of being digitally sorted into a list of recommendations For Viewers Who Liked Bird Box, though that classification would be more accurately clocked as For Viewers Who Liked A Quiet Place... the demographic they're really after would be something closer to Viewers Who Have Trouble Telling Similar Things Apart." Deciders Anna Menta compared the films, "The Silence is much darker and gorier than A Quiet Place," and found The Silence to look low-budget in production values. Menta said The Silence was started before the invasion while A Quiet Place was set fully after the invasion. She noted the criticism of The Silence for having a hearing actor as a deaf character and highlighted its additional elements, a teen romance and a religious cult.

Writing for Comic Book Resources, Renaldo Matadeen contrasted The Silence from A Quiet Place, writing, "There are quite a few plot threads which make it clear the Netflix movie is far from a rip-off and is, in fact, it's [sic] own thing." Matadeen said The Silences deaf teenage girl can read lips and speak, "After a while, you almost forget Ally is deaf, resulting in the film lacking some of the genuine tension of A Quiet Place. He found the creatures "totally different" as well as the times compared to the creature invasion. While both films have "a somewhat similar format" in families trying to survive the creatures, "In The Silence, we get interference from external segments of mankind via the Hushed."

See also
List of films featuring the deaf and hard of hearing

References

External links
 
 

2019 films
2019 horror films
2010s monster movies
American monster movies
German horror films
Films about cults
Films based on British novels
Films directed by John R. Leonetti
Films scored by Tomandandy
Films shot in Toronto
English-language Netflix original films
English-language German films
2010s English-language films
2010s American films
2010s German films